Stephen Daniels (born 20 July 1990) is an Irish hurler who currently plays as a left corner-back for the Waterford senior team.

Daniels made his first appearance for the team during the 2010 National League, however, he didn't become a Waterford regular until the 2012 championship. A former member of the Waterford minor and under-21 teams, he has yet to win any major honors at senior level with Waterford.

At club level Daniels is a two-time Munster medalist with De La Salle. In addition to this he has also won two county club championship medals.

References

1990 births
Living people
De La Salle hurlers
Waterford inter-county hurlers